Planta Solar de Salamanca is a 13.8 peak MW photovoltaic power plant located in Salamanca, Spain.  The plant consists of approximately 70,000 Kyocera solar panels, occupying approximately 36-hectare (89-acre) site.

The plant was opened for operation on September 18, 2007.

See also

Photovoltaic power stations

References

Photovoltaic power stations in Spain